Farced is a 1988 record from the band Volcano Suns.

Track listing
All lyrics by Peter Prescott, except track 1 (Bob Grant).  All music as noted.

Personnel

Volcano Suns
Peter Prescott – drums, vocals
Bob Weston – bass, vocals, trumpet
Chuck Hahn – guitar, vocals

Additional Personnel
Nick Maldonado: Sampler
Gary Waleik, Michael Cudany: Guitars
David Kleiler: Guitars, Backing Vocals
Chris George: Sitar
Tricia Matthews: Violin, Cello

References

1988 albums
SST Records albums
Volcano Suns albums